Ellis Wellwood Sifton  (12 October 1891 – 9 April 1917) was a Canadian soldier. Sifton was a recipient of the Victoria Cross, the highest and most prestigious award for gallantry in the face of the enemy that can be awarded to British and Commonwealth forces.

Sifton was born in Wallacetown, Ontario and was a farmer when he enlisted in October 1914. One of four soldiers to earn the Victoria Cross in the Battle of Vimy Ridge (the others were Thain Wendell MacDowell, William Johnstone Milne and John George Pattison), Sifton was 25 years old, and a Lance Sergeant in the 18th (Western Ontario) Battalion, Canadian Expeditionary Force during the First World War when the following deed took place for which he was awarded the Victoria Cross.

Victoria Cross 
On 9 April 1917 at Neuville-St.-Vaast, France, during an attack on enemy trenches, Lance-Sergeant Sifton's company was held up by machine-gun fire. During an attack on Vimy Ridge, "C" Company of the 18th Battalion was held up during its advance by German machine gunners who had survived the artillery barrage by taking refuge in concrete shelters. As the Canadians moved forward, the German machine guns swept the battlefield, causing heavy casualties. Sifton saw the machine gun nest first. He jumped up, rushed forward and leapt into the trench. He then charged into the German gun crew and knocked the gun over before turning on the gunners with his bayonet, killing each man. More Canadians hurried forward, but not before a small German party moved down the trench towards Sifton. He used his bayonet and his rifle as a club to fight them off until help arrived. Despite these efforts, Sifton was killed during the fighting.

Citation 
His Victoria Cross citation published in the London Gazette, dated 8 June 1917 reads:

His VC is held by the Elgin County Pioneer Museum in St Thomas, Ontario.

References

Further reading 
 Monuments to Courage (David Harvey, 1999)
 The Register of the Victoria Cross (This England, 1997)

External links
 Ellis Wellwood Sifton's digitized service file
 Biography at the Dictionary of Canadian Biography Online
 Legion Magazine Article on Ellis Wellwood Sifton
 Ellis Wellwood Sifton: Directorate of History and Heritage Victoria Cross Biography

Canadian World War I recipients of the Victoria Cross
1891 births
1917 deaths
Canadian military personnel killed in World War I
People from Elgin County
Canadian Expeditionary Force soldiers
Essex Scottish Regiment
Essex and Kent Scottish
Canadian military personnel from Ontario